is a judicial decision of the House of Lords relating to English contract law and the doctrine of undue influence.  The case is most well known for the comments of Lord Scarman about the supposed requirement of "manifest disadvantage" to set aside a contract for undue influence.

Facts
A bank manager who worked for National Westminster Bank came to Mrs Morgan’s house to get her to sign a charge, which was going to provide security for the refinance of the family home. She received no independent advice.  Mr Morgan died, and the bank later sought to enforce the charge.  Mrs Morgan resisted enforcement on the grounds that she had entered into the documents acting under the undue influence of the bank.

Mr Barrow went to the Morgan's to arrange signature of the legal charge.  The conduct of the visit is described in some detail in the final judgment:

Judgment

Court of Appeal
Dunn LJ held that manifest disadvantage was not a necessary ingredient of presumed undue influence, giving the example of a solicitor buying a client’s house. But there were no cases in which there was not a manifest disadvantage. Mrs Morgan did not fully consent to the charge.

House of Lords
The House of Lords held that ‘evidence that the transaction itself was wrongful in that it constituted an advantage taken of the person subjected to the influence’ was necessary. Moreover, there was no confidential relationship between the wife and the manager and it never went ‘beyond the normal business relationship of banker and customer’ so no presumption could arise.

Lord Scarman, who gave the only substantive judgment, said the following.

The case was often cited as proposition that the House of Lords required "manifest disadvantage" in order to set aside a transaction for undue influence.  See for example the comments of Slade LJ in Bank of Credit and Commerce International SA v Aboody [1992] 4 All ER 955.  However, Lord Scarman did not say that directly, only that: "...I know of no reported authority where the transaction set aside was not to the manifest disadvantage of the person influenced."  In CIBC Mortgages plc v Pitt [1994] 1 AC 200 Lord Browne-Wilkinson confirmed that Lord Scarman had not been seeking to lay down a general principle, and that manifest disadvantage was not required for cases of actual (as opposed to presumed) undue influence.

Subsequent cases

See also

English contract law

Notes

References

English contract case law
House of Lords cases
1985 in British law
1985 in case law
NatWest Group litigation